Aulong is a state constituency in Perak, Malaysia, that has been represented in the Perak State Legislative Assembly.

Demographics

History

Polling districts
According to the federal gazette issued on 31 October 2022, the Aulong constituency is divided into 16 polling districts.

Representation history

Results

References

Perak state constituencies